The Chemist is a heritage-listed shop at 60 Churchill Street, Childers, Bundaberg Region, Queensland, Australia. It was added to the Queensland Heritage Register on 21 August 1992.

References

Attribution

External links 

Queensland Heritage Register
Childers, Queensland
Commercial buildings in Queensland
Articles incorporating text from the Queensland Heritage Register